Caricom Airways, which stands for Caribbean Commuter Airways, was a regional airline from the Caribbean, with the headquarters of the company at Paramaribo, Suriname. From the down-town Zorg en Hoop Airport in Suriname, Caricom Airways mainly flew charter flights to various destinations in the interior of Suriname, the Caribbean and Northern Brazil.

Caricom Airways had plans for regular flights to regional destinations. The airline had earlier temporarily set those plans aside for cooperation with Surinam Airways (SLM = Surinaamse Luchtvaart Maatschappij). As its feeder commuter airline Caricom Airways carried out few scheduled flights to the hinterland of Suriname for SLM. This National airline, Surinam Airways (SLM), in collaboration with Caricom Airways, reintroduced domestic service to various destinations in Suriname using three aircraft belonging to Caricom Airways: two Islanders and a Cessna 206. Operational control remained in the hands of Caricom Airways. SLM periodically performed quality checks on the aircraft and audited Caricom Airways. Passengers were eventually able to book these domestic flights through SLM's worldwide booking, which the airline had hoped to spur the local tourism industry. This joint venture also included METS Tours, a subsidiary of Surinam Airways. Caricom Airways retained its identity but joined SLM's quality program and flew with their colours.

Caricom Airways was earlier planning to add four 50 seat-turboprops to its fleet of smaller Islander, Cessna and Piper aircraft to launch regional scheduled flights. The airline did not finalize this flight schedule, but the plan was to serve Boa Vista International Airport (BVB), Bridgetown Grantley Adams International Airport (BGI), Georgetown Cheddi Jagan International Airport (GEO) and St. Lucia Hewanorra International Airport (UVF) from Paramaribo Johan Adolf Pengel International Airport (PBM). It had previously planned to operate scheduled flights to several Eastern Caribbean islands from its Caribbean hub at Saint Lucia but never received the necessary approvals.

History
The company was founded on April 13, 2004, as Kuyake Aviation (Kuyake is Surinamese for toucan). At first the main mission of the company was to provide flight training towards the Private & Commercial Pilot License. Kuyake Aviation started with a Cessna 337G Super Skymaster (PZ-PYV) and a Cessna 172R Skyhawk (PZ-NYQ). Later in 2005 a Cessna 206H Stationair (PZ-TYA) airplane was added. In August 2006 a Piper PA-31-350 Chieftain (PZ-PTA) with Panther conversion was bought followed by another Piper PA-31-350 Chieftain (PZ-TYW).

In 2009 the main focus shifted from flight training to Commercial Services. With this change of mission the decision was also made to split the company to "Caribbean Commuter Airways N.V." (abbreviated: Caricom Airways N.V.) and "Kuyake Aviation Academy". 
Caricom Airways had a fleet expansion in 2010 when two Britten-Norman BN-2A Islander (PZ-TYD & PZ-TYL) arrived for passenger charters. In 2013 Britten-Norman BN-2A-26 Islander (PZ-TYD) was painted in full SLM Commuter colours with small Caricom Airways titles, named "Village of Djoemoe".

Kuyake Aviation was also based at the Zorg en Hoop Airport in Paramaribo, Suriname and was a modern school facility operating a fleet of Cessna Aircraft & Simulators all equipped with the latest in Glass Cockpit Technology. Caribbean Commuter Airways in the meantime was divided into Caricom Airways Barbados as a regional charter airline and Caricom Airways Suriname, both using the Caribbean Commuter Airways logo, and operating as a domestic charter airline within Suriname and the Caribbean region, together with running the Caricom Airways Flight Academy effectively with Kuyake Aviation Flight Academy.

In 2011 a cooperation was reached with EZ AIR from Bonaire, this company regularly flew between Bonaire, Curaçao and Aruba, later also to Saba and Sint Maarten using two Islanders, eventually taking over one Islander aircraft (PZ-TYD to PJ-TYD) from Caricom Airways. In 2018 the owners of Caricom Airways moved to Curacao to open up a new airline and flight school to be named " Dutch Caribbean Islandhopper".

Former Fleet
Caricom Airways had a fleet of different types of aircraft.

Former Destinations
Caricom Airways flew charters to 67 destinations, including 62 within the CARICOM and 5 abroad:

  CARICOM Destinations
  Anguilla, The Valley (Anguilla Wallblake Airport)
  Antigua, Saint John (VC Bird International Airport)
  Barbados, Bridgetown (Grantley Adams International Airport)
  Dominica, Marigot (Melville Hall Airport), Roseau (Canefield Airport)
  Grenada, St. George's (Point Salines International Airport)
  Guyana, Georgetown (Cheddi Jagan International Airport)
  Guyana, Georgetown (Ogle Airport)
  Montserrat, John A. Osborne Airport)
  Saint Kitts & Nevis, Basseterre (Robert L. Bradshaw International Airport)
  Saint Kitts & Nevis, Charlestown (Vance W. Amory International Airport)
  Saint Lucia, Castries (George FL Charles Airport)
  Saint Lucia Vieux-Fort (Hewanorra International Airport)
  Saint Vincent and the Grenadines, Kingstown (Argyle International Airport)
  Saint Vincent and the Grenadines Bequia (JF Mitchell Airport)
  Saint Vincent and the Grenadines Canouan (Canouan Airport)
  Saint Vincent and the Grenadines Mustique (Mustique Airport)
  Saint Vincent and the Grenadines Union Island (Union Island Airport)
  Suriname, Afobaka (Afobaka Airstrip)
  Suriname Alalapadu (Alalapadu Airstrip)
  Suriname Albina (Albina Airstrip)
  Suriname Amatopo (Amatopo Airstrip)
  Suriname Apetina (Apetina Airstrip)
  Suriname Bakhuis Mountains (Bakhuys Airstrip)
  Suriname Botopasi (Botopassi Airstrip)
  Suriname Cabana (Cabana Airstrip)
  Suriname Kajana (Cayana Airstrip)
  Suriname Coeroeni (Coeroeni Airstrip)
  Suriname Djoemoe (Djoemoe Airstrip)
  Suriname Donderskamp (Donderskamp Airstrip)
  Suriname Drietabbetje (Drietabbetje Airstrip)
  Suriname Gakaba (Gakaba Airstrip)
  Suriname Godo Holo (Godo Holo Airstrip)
  Suriname Gross Rose Bell (Gross Rosebell Airstrip)
  Suriname Kabalebo (Kabalebo Airstrip)
  Suriname Kayser Mountains (Kayser Airstrip)
  Suriname Kwamelasemoetoe (Kwamelasemoetoe Airstrip)
  Suriname Laduani (Laduani Airstrip)
  Suriname Langatabbetje (Langatabbetje Airstrip)
  Suriname Lawa Anapaike (Lawa Anapaike Airstrip)
  Suriname Lawa Antino (Lawa Antino Airstrip)
  Suriname Lawa Cottica (Lawa Cottica Airstrip)
  Suriname Lawa Tabiki (Lawa Tabiki Airstrip)
  Suriname Lely Mountains (Lelygebergte Airstrip)
  Suriname Moengo (Moengo Airstrip)
  Suriname, New Nickerie (Major Henk Fernandes Airport)
  Suriname, Njoeng Jacob Kondre (Njoeng Jacob Kondre Airstrip)
  Suriname Paloemeu (Paloemeu Airstrip)
  Suriname Paramaribo (Johan Adolf Pengel International Airport)
  Suriname Paramaribo (Zorg en Hoop Airport)
  Suriname Poeketi (Poeketi Airstrip)
  Suriname Poesoegroenoe (Poesoegroenoe Airstrip)
  Suriname Ragoebarsing (Ragoebarsing Airstrip)
  Suriname Raleigh Falls (Raleigh Airstrip)
  Suriname Sarakreek (Sarakreek Airstrip)
  Suriname Saramacca (Henri Alwies Airstrip)
  Suriname Sipaliwini Savanna (Sipaliwini Airstrip)
  Suriname Stoelmanseiland (Stoelmanseiland Airstrip)
  Suriname, Tafelberg (Tafelberg Airstrip)
  Suriname Tepoe (Tepoe Airstrip)
  Suriname Totnes (Totness Airstrip)
  Suriname, Four Brothers (Vier Gebroeders Airstrip)
  Suriname Wageningen (Wageningen Airstrip)
  Tobago, Scarborough (Crown Point Airport)
  Trinidad, Port of Spain (Piarco International Airport)

Outside the CARICOM:
  Brazil, Belém (Val de Cans International Airport)
  Brazil Boa Vista (Boa Vista International Airport)
  Brazil Macapá (Macapa International Airport)
  Brazil Manaus (Eduardo Gomes International Airport)
  Brazil Santarém (Santarém Airport)

References

External links
 Caricom Airways Website
 "The True Time" May 13, 2009
 "Times of Suriname" 12 May 2009
 "ICAO Designator CRB" (Kuyake Aviation d / b / a Caribbean Commuter Airways)
 "Carib News Network" June 2, 2010

Defunct airlines of Suriname
Airlines established in 2004
Airlines disestablished in 2018
Companies of Suriname